KDLR (1240 AM) is an American commercial radio station licensed to serve Devils Lake, North Dakota.  The station is owned by Double Z Broadcasting, Inc., and operated along with its three sister stations under the collective name Lake Region Radio Works. It airs a classic country music format.

KDLR was originally on 1300 kHz. It moved to 1210 kHz in 1928 then to 1240 kHz in 1941 as a result of the NARBA agreement.

The station was assigned the KDLR call letters in 1925 by the U.S. Department of Commerce, regulators of radio at the time.

References

External links
FCC History Cards for KDLR
KDLR official website

DLR
Classic country radio stations in the United States
Radio stations established in 1925
Ramsey County, North Dakota
1925 establishments in North Dakota